Enikepadu is a locality of Vijayawada in NTR district of the Indian state of Andhra Pradesh. According to the G.O. No. M.S.104 (dated 23 March 2017), Municipal Administration and Urban Development Department, the it became a part of Vijayawada metropolitan area.It contains huge number of industries

See also 
List of villages in Krishna district

References 

Neighbourhoods in Vijayawada